Tera Intezar is the debut pop album by singer Rahul Vaidya. Composed by Sajid–Wajid, the album consist of eight songs. The title track was a major hit from the album. "Kuch to kaho" is a duet song by Rahul Vaidya and Prajakta Shukre.

Track listing

References 

2005 albums
Rahul Vaidya albums